HMS Arrow was an  destroyer of the Royal Navy. She served during the Second World War before being damaged while fighting a fire on an ammunition ship and written off in 1943.

Construction and commissioning
Arrow was ordered on 6 March 1928 under the 1927 Naval Estimates.  She was laid down on 20 August 1928 at the yards of Vickers-Armstrongs, Barrow-in-Furness, as Yard No 642. She was launched a year later on 22 August 1929 and was commissioned on 14 April 1930.  She was adopted by the civil community of the Rural District of Blackwell, Derbyshire in February 1942 following a successful Warship Week National Savings Campaign.

Career

Escort duties
On the outbreak of the Second World War, Arrow was deployed at Portland with the 18th Destroyer Flotilla for anti-submarine patrol and convoy defence duties. She carried out these duties into October, and on 24 October put into Devonport Dockyard to undergo repairs to fix turbine defects. These repairs lasted until December, and on her return to service in January Arrow was nominated to join the 16th Destroyer Flotilla at Portsmouth. Arrow was detached on 30 January and returned to Devonport to undergo repairs to her machinery.

The Norwegian coast
These repairs lasted until March, and on 10 March she resumed her convoy defence duties in the English Channel and the Western Approaches. She was transferred to 12th Destroyer Flotilla with the Home Fleet in April, and tasked with supporting the military operations following on from the landings of Allied troops in Norway following the German invasion. She sailed to Rosyth and on 16 April she embarked troops and stores for Namsos, Norway. She sailed with her sister,  on 17 April and on 19 April she landed her troops and stores at Åndalsnes, rather than Namsos. Once this had been carried out, she returned to Rosyth. They landed the troops and stores on 25 April and on 26 April sailed from Molde to engage enemy trawlers, disguised as Dutch but believed to be being deployed in advance of transports bringing enemy reinforcements. Arrow engaged the German trawler Schelswig (Schiff 37), but was accidentally rammed by Birmingham during the action. Arrow suffered serious structural damage and had to be withdrawn from operational service. She returned to the United Kingdom on 27 April, escorted by Acheron and was taken in hand on 29 April by a commercial shipyard at Middlesbrough.

She was back in service by 13 May and rejoined the Norwegian operations on 14 May. She rescued 80 survivors that day from Norwegian ships that had been sunk by German air attacks on ships carrying refugees to the Faroe Islands. The troops were taken to Harstad in preparation for their final evacuation from Norway. They returned to the UK where Arrow returned to her flotilla duties. She then sailed to the Nore and on 26 June she was taken in hand for a refit at Sheerness. The work involved improving her anti-aircraft defence capabilities.

The Western Approaches
She rejoined the 16th Destroyer Flotilla at Harwich on 4 July, and was active on anti-invasion patrol and convoy defence duties off the east coast.  On 24 July she was transferred to the Western Approaches Defence Force, based at Greenock.  She was deployed on convoy defence duties in the North Western Approaches and on 16 August she and Achates attacked a U-boat that had been sighted by the armed merchant cruiser Cheshire. On 27 August Arrow rescued survivors from a Greek steamer and on 13 September she rescued survivors from the Greek merchant vessel SS Poseidon. On 8 October she joined the fast military convoy WS-3 in the Clyde as an escort, along with the cruiser  and the destroyers Achates,  and ', covering the convoy's passage through the North Western Approaches.  Arrow and the escorting destroyers were detached on 12 October and returned to the Clyde, where they resumed convoy defence duties for Iceland convoys. Kenya remained with the convoy as far as Freetown.

On 13 November Arrow rescued survivors from the merchant vessel , which had been sunk by an air attack in the North Atlantic. San Demetrio had been attacked by the German cruiser  on 5 November, but after initially abandoning the then-burning ship the crew had re-boarded her to ensure the salvage of her valuable cargo. They arrived in the Clyde on 16 October, and Arrow entered repair at the Barclay Curle shipyard the following day, to fix her machinery. She was not back in action again until 14 January 1941, when she rejoined the Home Fleet. She joined the 3rd Destroyer Flotilla for anti-submarine defence of convoys the following day. February saw Arrow deployed in the North Western Approaches and the North Sea, escorting Icelandic convoys from Aberdeen, Scapa Flow and the Clyde.

Repairs and mining
She joined the military convoy WS-7 in the Clyde on 24 March, as an escort with the battleship , during the convoy's Atlantic passage to Freetown. She and Nelson were detached on 4 April and returned to Scapa Flow. During this time, she developed problems with her boilers that required attention. She put into Chatham for a refit on 2 May and was withdrawn from operational service whilst her boilers were re-tubed.  The work was completed by June and she sailed to rejoin the Fleet. On 21 June, whilst on passage to Scapa Flow she detonated a mine off Flamborough Head and had to put into Middlesbrough on one boiler. She was taken in hand by Smiths Dock on 22 June for repairs that lasted until October and involved repairing her repair machinery mountings and replacing bulkheads. During this time she was nominated for foreign service, and after carrying out post repair trials she was prepared for service in the Eastern Mediterranean.

Transfer to the Mediterranean
The same ships left the next day for Malta, where they arrived on 24 November. The ships arrived at Alexandria on 29 November, where Arrow and the other escorts joined the Mediterranean Fleet.

January 1942 saw her deploying out of Alexandria, where on 12 January she was the target of a failed attack by an enemy submarine. Arrow then carried out an unsuccessful search for her attacker with fellow destroyer . On 24 January she formed part of the escort for the Malta convoy MF-4.

They came under heavy and sustained air attacks on 13 February, during which the merchant  was badly damaged and had to be under escort to Tobruk. The attacks continued throughout 14 February and another member of the convoy, had to be abandoned after she caught fire. The escorting force then turned over the escort of MW-9 to Force K, which took the merchants on to Malta, whilst they took over the escort of Breconshire and three merchants of convoy ME-10 from Force K and escorted them into Alexandria. They arrived in port on 15 February. In March Arrow was transferred to the Indian Ocean to reinforce the Eastern Fleet.

With the Eastern Fleet
Arrow deployed on 15 April, providing anti-submarine protection for convoys sailing between Madagascar and the Cape of Good Hope. She was withdrawn from active service on 20 May after suffering a series of defects, and was taken in hand at Durban on 21 May for a refit.

She resumed her duties on 2 July, and spent August escorting convoys between the Cape of Good Hope and Madagascar. In September she was nominated to support the final occupation of Madagascar. She was released from the operation on 30 September and was transferred to Freetown, West Africa for convoy defence duties in the South Atlantic. She took up her position there in October, and on 8 October she deployed off Cape Town with Active and Foxhound on anti-submarine search operations, and rescuing survivors from sunken mercantiles. She was again withdrawn from service in November owing to a recurrence of machinery defects. She returned to the UK and was under repair in a commercial shipyard at Middlesbrough from 18 November. These repairs lasted until March 1943, and she returned to Scapa Flow on 26 March for working up. She struck the boom defences on 10 April whilst working up and had to head for London on 11 April for repairs. She was taken in hand on 13 March by Green and Silley Weir at Blackwall. She was under repair until May, when she returned to Scapa Flow on 30 May for working up.

Gibraltar and Sicily
Having started working up on 3 June, she was assigned to serve with the 13th Destroyer Flotilla at Gibraltar. Arrow was detached with the ships of KMF-17 on 26 June when the destroyer escort for WS-31 to Freetown arrived from Gibraltar. She then escorted the ships of KMF-17 to Gibraltar with the same destroyers and then joined the Flotilla on arrival. In July she was nominated for duty with Support Force East during the planned landings in Sicily. She took part in the landings on 10 July with the support force, and was then deployed to escort the follow-up convoys.

Damage and scrapping
Whilst in harbour at Algiers on 4 August Arrow was set on fire by the explosion of the merchant ship . She sustained heavy damage, suffered many casualties and ended up disabled. She was towed to Gibraltar, arriving there on 18 September to undergo repairs. Temporary repairs were carried out throughout October, before she was towed to Taranto for permanent repairs. She left Gibraltar on 19 November, arriving at Taranto on 27 November.  A survey was carried out in December to assess the extent of work required, and January to September 1944 was spent under repair.  As the repairs continued, the state of the ship was found to be increasingly unsatisfactory, and her future use was now under consideration. On 17 October it was decided that repair work was to be suspended and the ship was to be de-equipped.  This was carried out by December, and by January 1945 the ship was a hulk at Taranto.  She remained there until May 1949, when she was broken up.

Notes

References

External links
HMS Arrow's wartime career
HMS Arrow at Uboat.net

 

A- and B-class destroyers
Ships built in Barrow-in-Furness
1929 ships
World War II destroyers of the United Kingdom
Maritime incidents in August 1943